Pythocles of Sicyon was an ancient Greek athlete listed by Eusebius of Caesarea as a victor in the stadion race of the 136th Olympiad (236 BC).

In his later career Pythocles appears to have served as a representative of the Achaean League. The evidence comes from an inscription in Epidaurus where he is mentioned in a honorific list together with 23 other nomographoi. On that list his father's name is given as Pythodoros.

References

See also  
Olympic winners of the Stadion race

Ancient Olympic competitors
Ancient Achaean athletes
3rd-century BC Greek people
Ancient Sicyonians
Sicyon